Ogugua "O.G." Anunoby Jr. (born 17 July 1997) is a British professional basketball player for the Toronto Raptors of the National Basketball Association (NBA). He played college basketball for the Indiana Hoosiers.

Early life
Ogugua Anunoby Jr. was born in the Harlesden area of London on 17 July 1997, to Nigerian parents. His father, Ogugua Sr., taught as a professor in England at the time. His mother died of cancer when he was one year old. At the age of four, Anunoby moved with his family to the U.S. and settled in Jefferson City, Missouri, where his father was a professor of finance at Lincoln University. His older brother, Chigbo, played in the NFL for the Cleveland Browns, Tennessee Titans, and Minnesota Vikings before entering medical school. Anunoby played football when he was young, but stopped around the age of eight to focus on basketball more because of his height.

Anunoby played for Jefferson City High School. During his senior season, he averaged 19.1 points and 8.6 rebounds per game and was named a finalist for Mr Basketball in the state of Missouri. In October 2014, Anunoby chose to attend Indiana University over Georgia, Iowa, George Mason, and Ole Miss.

College career
As a freshman in 2015–16 at Indiana, Anunoby appeared in 34 games, averaging 6.9 points, 6.6 rebounds, and 0.6 assists per game.

Anunoby was selected as a Pre-season All-American by The Sporting News. On 18 January 2017, Anunoby injured his right knee against Penn State, causing him to undergo season-ending knee surgery. On 10 April 2017, Anunoby declared his intention to enter the 2017 NBA Draft and hire an agent, ending his tenure with the Hoosiers.

Professional career

Toronto Raptors (2017–present)
On 22 June 2017, he was selected with the 23rd overall pick in the 2017 NBA draft by the Toronto Raptors. On 9 July, he signed his rookie scale contract with the Raptors. On 14 November, Anunoby made his first career start, against the Houston Rockets. He finished the game with 16 points, 2 rebounds, 1 assist and 1 steal in 30 minutes. By 15 December, he led starter rookies in offensive and defensive rating and had the third highest true shooting percentage and best turnover-to-assist ratio for a non-guard.

On 29 January 2019, Anunoby was named a member of the World Team representing the United Kingdom for the 2019 Rising Stars Challenge. In April 2019, Anunoby had an emergency appendectomy, which caused him to miss most of the Raptors' championship playoff run. He dressed for the NBA Finals but did not play as the Raptors went on to win the title, becoming the first British player to win an NBA championship.

On 1 March 2020, Anunoby scored 32 points and recorded seven steals, along with seven rebounds and three assists in a 133–118 loss against the Denver Nuggets. He hit a game-winning buzzer-beater three-pointer on 3 September, in a 104–103 win in Game 3 of the Eastern Conference semifinals against the Boston Celtics, and finished with 12 points. The buzzer-beater prevented the Raptors from going down to a 0–3 deficit to the Celtics. The Raptors would eventually fall in seven games. On 21 December 2020, he signed a four year, $72 million extension, through the 2024–25 season. On 24 January 2021, Anunoby scored a season-high 30 points while getting eight rebounds, one assist, five steals, and a block in a 107–102 win against the Indiana Pacers. He joins former Raptor Kawhi Leonard as the only players with multiple games getting 30 points, five rebounds, and five steals in franchise history. On 1 November, Anunoby scored a career-high 36 points along with 6 rebounds and 2 assists along with the win against the Knicks.

On 25 February 2022, Anunoby was sidelined due to a right finger fracture suffered against the Charlotte Hornets. On 3 March, he was ruled out for two weeks to rest his fractured finger.

On 16 November 2022, Anunoby scored a season-high 32 points during a 112–104 win against the Miami Heat.

Personal life
Anunoby has said, "It's definitely a goal of mine to inspire kids in Great Britain to want to play basketball and show that they can make it to the NBA from Britain." He is also a fan of the football club Arsenal FC.

Anunoby is considered one of the best British players to ever play in the NBA.

Career statistics

NBA

Regular season

|-
| style="text-align:left;"| 
| style="text-align:left;"| Toronto
| 74 || 62 || 20.0 || .471 || .371 || .629 || 2.5 || .7 || .7 || .2 || 5.9
|-
| style="text-align:left;background:#afe6ba;"| †
| style="text-align:left;"| Toronto
| 67 || 6 || 20.2 || .453 || .332 || .581 || 2.9 || .7 || .7 || .3 || 7.0
|-
| style="text-align:left;"| 
| style="text-align:left;"| Toronto
| 69 || 68 || 29.9 || .505 || .390 || .706 || 5.3 || 1.6 || 1.4 || .7 || 10.6
|-
| style="text-align:left;"| 
| style="text-align:left;"| Toronto
| 43 || 43 || 33.3 || .480 || .398 || .784 || 5.5 || 2.2 || 1.5 || .7 || 15.9
|-
| style="text-align:left;"| 
| style="text-align:left;"| Toronto
| 48 || 48 || 36.0 || .443 || .363 || .754 || 5.5 || 2.6 || 1.5 || .5 || 17.1
|- class="sortbottom"
| style="text-align:center;" colspan="2"| Career
| 253 || 179 || 25.0 || .480 || .375 || .692 || 3.9 || 1.2 || 1.0 || .4 || 9.2

Playoffs

|-
| style="text-align:left;"| 2018
| style="text-align:left;"| Toronto
| 10 || 10 || 23.8 || .558 || .448 || .727 || 2.1 || .7 || .6 || .4 || 7.9
|-
| style="text-align:left;"| 2020
| style="text-align:left;"| Toronto
| 11 || 11 || 35.7 || .455 || .415 || .643 || 6.9 || 1.2 || 1.0 || 1.2 || 10.5
|-
| style="text-align:left;"| 2022
| style="text-align:left;"| Toronto
| 6 || 6 || 36.1 || .476 || .341 || .750 || 4.0 || 2.5 || 1.0 || .2 || 17.3
|- class="sortbottom"
| style="text-align:center;" colspan="2"| Career
| 27 || 27 || 31.4 || .486 || .396 || .691 || 4.5 || 1.3 || .9 || .7 || 11.0

College

|-
| style="text-align:left;"| 2015–16
| style="text-align:left;"| Indiana
| 34 || 0 || 13.7 || .569 || .448 || .476 || 2.6 || .5 || .8 || .8 || 4.9
|-
| style="text-align:left;"| 2016–17
| style="text-align:left;"| Indiana
| 16 || 10 || 25.1 || .557 || .311 || .563 || 5.4 || 1.4 || 1.3 || 1.3 || 11.1
|- class="sortbottom"
| style="text-align:center;" colspan="2"| Career
| 50 || 10 || 17.4 || .563 || .365 || .522 || 3.5 || .8 || 1.0 || .9 || 6.8

References

External links
 
 
Indiana Hoosiers bio

1997 births
Living people
Basketball players from Greater London
Basketball players from Missouri
Black British sportspeople
British expatriate basketball people in the United States
British expatriate basketball people in Canada
National Basketball Association players from the United Kingdom
English men's basketball players
English emigrants to the United States
English people of Nigerian descent
Forwards (basketball)
Indiana Hoosiers men's basketball players
Jefferson City High School alumni
National Basketball Association players from England
Sportspeople from Jefferson City, Missouri
Toronto Raptors draft picks
Toronto Raptors players